But Not for Me is a 1959 Paramount Pictures comedy film starring Clark Gable and Carroll Baker. It is based on the 1934 play Accent on Youth  written by Samson Raphaelson.

Plot
Russ Ward is a Broadway producer with a 30-year record of success who has been out of town. On returning to New York, everybody wants a piece of him: ex-wife Kathryn Ward, hard-drinking playwright Jeremiah "Mac" MacDonald, magazine reporter Roy Morton, business manager Miles Atwood, and lawyer Charles Montgomery, one after another.

The main topic of discussion is Give Me Your Hand, the new play Russ is producing. The reporter hears it's in trouble, but Russ says that's untrue. It will be ready for its Boston tryout right on schedule, he vows.

Kathryn keeps reminding him of his age, which Russ likes to lie about. Russ tells loyal young secretary and student actress Ellie Brown it is likely time to retire because the new show is a mess. He and writer Mac have a story about a middle-aged man romancing a 22-year-old woman, and just can't seem to make it work.

Ellie is in love with Russ, so much so she proposes marriage to him. That gives him an idea. What if the play had the young woman pursuing the man? That way he wouldn't seem such a lecher. A delighted Mac rewrites it, and everyone involved works on it at the Long Island mansion where the former actress Kathryn lives, partly thanks to her alimony from Russ.

A rich backer named Bacos wants in, but Atwood says his money isn't needed because an anonymous angel is financing the whole show. Ellie reads the woman's part, and strikes everybody as perfect for it. Gordon Reynolds, an up-and-coming young actor in Ellie's acting class, gets the male lead, and promptly falls for Ellie, but she's being led on by Russ, who doesn't discourage her love for him.

The show's so-so in Boston, and a few of them panic, but Russ insists it'll be a hit on Broadway, and, sure enough, he's right. Now, he needs to let down Ellie gently, and next thing he knows, she and Gordon have gotten married. Ellie returns exasperated because Gordon wants to give up theater and move to Montana. She strips and leaps into Russ's bed so Gordon can catch her there and demand an annulment.

Everybody gets every misunderstanding sorted out. The newly-weds decide to compromise, and Russ, who finally has figured out that Kathryn was the anonymous angel who financed the show, is ready to give their relationship a second act.

Cast
Clark Gable ... Russell "Russ" Ward
Carroll Baker ... Ellie Brown / Borden
Lilli Palmer ... Kathryn Ward
Lee J. Cobb ... Jeremiah MacDonald
Barry Coe ... Gordon Reynolds
Thomas Gomez ... Demetrios Bacos
Charles Lane ... Atwood
Wendell Holmes ... Montgomery
Tom Duggan ... Roy Morton

Previous versions
The 1935 movie Accent on Youth starred Herbert Marshall and Sylvia Sidney. The 1950 film version was a musical entitled Mr. Music, starring Bing Crosby and Nancy Olson.

Novelization
A worthwhile novelization of the screenplay was written by American writer Edward S. Aarons (1916-1975) under the mild pseudonym Edward Ronns, published in a mass market, tie-in paperback edition by Pyramid Books (cover price 35¢) with a release date of September, 1959 and copyright assigned to Paramount Pictures Corporation. (Aarons is best known for his prolific "Assignment" espionage series, featuring agent Sam Durell.)

References

External links

 

1959 films
American comedy films
American films based on plays
1950s English-language films
Paramount Pictures films
Films directed by Walter Lang
Films scored by Leith Stevens
1959 comedy films
Films produced by William Perlberg
Films produced by George Seaton
1950s American films